Luis Antonio Lopez (born September 1, 1964) is an American former professional catcher and first baseman. He played in Major League Baseball for 41 games for the Los Angeles Dodgers and Cleveland Indians and later in Nippon Professional Baseball.

Overall, he batted .303 with 129 home runs over his Japanese career.

He was born to a family of Puerto Rican migrants. His father, Victor Lopez, ran a supermarket. His mother, Providencia Pagan, was a housewife. He has two older siblings named Victor and Nancy. Baseball runs deep in the family. Lopez’s grandfather Jose Lopez was local sports coach in the family’s hometown of Quebradillas, Puerto Rico. His uncles Luis and Wilfredo Lopez, were both patrons of local sports occasions.

References

1964 births
Living people
Los Angeles Dodgers players
Cleveland Indians players
Major League Baseball catchers
Major League Baseball first basemen
Hiroshima Toyo Carp players
Fukuoka Daiei Hawks players
American expatriate baseball players in Japan
Great Falls Dodgers players
Vero Beach Dodgers players
Bakersfield Dodgers players
San Antonio Missions players
Albuquerque Dukes players
Colorado Springs Sky Sox players
Canton-Akron Indians players
Charlotte Knights players
Richmond Braves players
Buffalo Bisons (minor league) players
Somerset Patriots players
Baseball players from New York (state)
Nippon Professional Baseball coaches
Lafayette High School (New York City) alumni